John Isaacs (1915–2009) was an American professional basketball player who was inducted into the Basketball Hall of Fame.

John or Jon Isaacs may also refer to:
John Alfred Isaacs (c. 1861–1944), Victoria, Australia politician
John Dove Isaacs (1919–1980), American engineer and oceanographer
John O. Isaacs (1920–2001), English aeronautical engineer
Jon Isaacs (born 1949), Australian politician

See also
John Isaac (disambiguation)